Webster County is a county located in the U.S. state of Missouri. As of the 2010 census, the population was 36,202. Its county seat is Marshfield. The county was organized in 1855 and named for U.S. Senator and U.S. Secretary of State Daniel Webster.

Webster County is part of the Springfield, MO Metropolitan Statistical Area.

History

Webster County was organized on March 3, 1855, and encompasses some of the highest extensive upland area of Missouri's Ozarks. The judicial seat is Marshfield, which lies 1,490 feet above sea level. Webster County is the highest county seat in the state of Missouri. Pioneer Legislator John F. McMahan named the county and county seat for Daniel Webster, and his Marshfield, Massachusetts home.

Marshfield was laid out in 1856 by R.H. Pitts, on land that was given by C.F. Dryden and W.T. and B.F.T. Burford. Until a courthouse was built, the county business was conducted at Hazelwood where Joseph W. McClurg, later Governor of Missouri, operated a general store. Today's Carthage Marble courthouse was built in 1939-1941 and is the county's third.

During the U.S. Civil War, a small force of pro-Southern troops was driven out of Marshfield in February 1862, and ten months later a body of Confederates was routed east of town. On January 9, 1863, General Joseph O. Shelby’s troops burned the stoutly built Union fortification at Marshfield and at Sand Springs, evacuated earlier. By 1862, the telegraph line passed near Marshfield on a route later called the "Old Wire Road".

A part of the 1808 Osage Native American land cession, the county was settled in the early 1830s by pioneers from Kentucky and Tennessee. A Native American trail crossed southern Webster County and many prehistoric mounds are in the area.

The railroad-building boom of the post Civil War period stimulated the county's growth as a dairy, poultry, and livestock producer. The Atlantic & Pacific (Frisco) Railroad was built through Marshfield in 1872, and by 1883 the Kansas City, Springfield, and Memphis (Frisco) crossed the county. Seymour, Rogersville, Fordland and Niangua grew up along the railroad routes.

Early schools in the county were Marshfield Academy, chartered in 1860; Mt. Dale Academy, opened in 1873; and Henderson Academy, chartered in 1879.

On April 18, 1880, an intense tornado measuring F4 on the Fujita scale struck Marshfield. The tornado killed 99 people and injured 100, and it is said that 10% of Marshfield's residents were killed and all but 15 of its buildings were destroyed. The composition “Marshfield Cyclone” by the African-American musician John W. (Blind) Boone gave wide publicity to the cyclone, which is still listed as one of the top ten natural disasters in the history of the nation.

Astronomer Edwin P. Hubble (1889–1953) was born in Marshfield and attended through the third grade in the public school system. A replica of the Hubble telescope sits in the courthouse yard and the Marshfield stretch of I-44 was named in his honor.

Marshfield holds claim to the oldest Independence Day parade west of the Mississippi River. Former President George Herbert Walker Bush and wife Barbara visited the parade on July 4, 1991, while campaigning for the presidency through Missouri. Webster County also boasts the longest continuous county fair in the state of Missouri.

The annual Seymour Apple Festival, established in 1973, has grown to one of Missouri's largest free celebrations, with estimated crowds of more than 30,000 congregating on the Seymour public square each second weekend of September. The festival pays tribute to Seymour's apple industry, which began in the 1840s, with Seymour being called "The Land Of The Big Red Apple" around the turn of the 20th century, when Webster County produced more than 50 percent of the state's apple crop.

Geography

Webster County straddles the drainage divide between the Missouri and White rivers and the headwaters of the James, Niangua, Gasconade, and Pomme de Terre rivers arise in Webster County.

Adjacent counties
Dallas County (northwest)
Laclede County (northeast)
Wright County (east)
Douglas County (southeast)
Christian County (southwest)
Greene County (west)

Major highways
 Interstate 44
 U.S. Route 60
 Route 38

Demographics

As of the census of 2000, there were 31,045 people, 11,073 households, and 8,437 families residing in the county. The population density was 52 people per square mile (20/km2). There were 12,052 housing units at an average density of 20 per square mile (8/km2). The racial makeup of the county was 96.20% White, 1.16% Black or African American, 0.65% Native American, 0.26% Asian, 0.03% Pacific Islander, 0.31% from other races, and 1.39% from two or more races. Approximately 1.29% of the population were Hispanic or Latino of any race.

There were 11,073 households, out of which 37.90% had children under the age of 18 living with them, 64.00% were married couples living together, 8.30% had a female householder with no husband present, and 23.80% were non-families. 20.40% of all households were made up of individuals, and 9.50% had someone living alone who was 65 years of age or older. The average household size was 2.72 and the average family size was 3.14.

In the county, the population was spread out, with 28.90% under the age of 18, 8.30% from 18 to 24, 29.70% from 25 to 44, 21.70% from 45 to 64, and 11.40% who were 65 years of age or older. The median age was 35 years. For every 100 females, there were 101.40 males. For every 100 females age 18 and over, there were 100.30 males.

The median income for a household in the county was $39,948, and the median income for a family was $46,941. Males had a median income of $28,168 versus $20,768 for females. The per capita income for the county was $17,948. About 9.60% of families and 14.80% of the population were below the poverty line, including 21.00% of those under age 18 and 14.10% of those age 65 or over.

2020 Census

Politics

Local

The Republican Party predominantly controls politics at the local level in Webster County. Republicans hold all of the elected positions in the county.

State

Webster County is split between Missouri's 137th and 141st Districts in the Missouri House of Representatives.

District 137 — John Black (R-Marshfield). Consists of the western part of the county.
District 141 — Hannah Kelly (R-Mountain Grove). Consists of the eastern part of the county.

All of Webster County is part of Missouri's 33rd District in the Missouri Senate and is currently represented by Mike Cunningham (R-Rogersville).

Federal

Most of Webster County is included in Missouri's 4th Congressional District, which is currently represented by Vicky Hartzler (R-Harrisonville) in the U.S. House of Representatives. The southwestern party of the county is included in the 7th Congressional District, which is represented by Billy Long (R-Springfield).

Political culture

Like most counties situated in Southwest Missouri, Webster County is a Republican stronghold in presidential elections. George W. Bush carried Webster County in 2000 and 2004 by around two-to-one margins, and like many other rural counties throughout Missouri, Webster County strongly favored John McCain over Barack Obama in 2008. The last Democratic presidential nominee to carry Webster County was Jimmy Carter in 1976.

Like most areas throughout the Bible Belt in Southwest Missouri, voters in Webster County traditionally adhere to socially and culturally conservative principles which tend to strongly influence their Republican leanings. In 2004, Missourians voted on a constitutional amendment to define marriage as the union between a man and a woman—it overwhelmingly passed Webster County with 82.32 percent of the vote. The initiative passed the state with 71 percent of support from voters as Missouri became the first state to ban same-sex marriage. In 2006, Missourians voted on a constitutional amendment to fund and legalize embryonic stem cell research in the state—it failed in Webster County with 57.94 percent voting against the measure. The initiative narrowly passed the state with 51 percent of support from voters as Missouri became one of the first states in the nation to approve embryonic stem cell research. Despite Webster County's longstanding tradition of supporting socially conservative platforms, voters in the county have a penchant for advancing populist causes like increasing the minimum wage. In 2006, Missourians voted on a proposition (Proposition B) to increase the minimum wage in the state to $6.50 an hour—it passed Webster County with 75.50 percent of the vote. The proposition strongly passed every single county in Missouri with 78.99 percent voting in favor as the minimum wage was increased to $6.50 an hour in the state. During the same election, voters in five other states also strongly approved increases in the minimum wage.

Missouri presidential preference primaries
In the open Presidential Primary of 2016, there were: 1,793 votes for Democrats; 6,878 votes for Republicans; 11 Libertarian votes, and 2 votes for candidates of the Constitution Party.  Among a field of Democrats, Bernie Sanders out-paced Hillary Clinton (53% vs. 45%) and others.  Among Republicans, Texas Senator Ted Cruz gained more votes (53%) than future President Donald J. Trump and the other contenders.

In 2012, Rick Santorum received 1,343 votes, more than any other candidate and approximately 63% of Republican votes cast.

Former Governor Mike Huckabee (R-Arkansas) received more votes, a total of 2,576, than any candidate from either party in Webster County during the 2008 presidential primary.

Education

Public schools
Fordland R-III School District - Fordland
Fordland Elementary School - (K-05)
Fordland Middle School - (06-08)
Fordland High School - (09-12)
Logan-Rogersville R-VIII School District - Rogersville
Logan-Rogersville Primary School - (PK-01)
Logan-Rogersville Elementary School - (02-03)
Logan-Rogersville Upper Elementary School - (04-06)
Logan-Rogersville Middle School - (07-08)
Logan-Rogersville High School - (09-12)
Marshfield R-I School District - Marshfield
Edwin P. Hubble Elementary School - (K-01)
Daniel Webster Elementary School - (02-03)
Shook Elementary School - (04-05)
Marshfield Jr. High School - (06-08)
Marshfield High School - (09-12)
Niangua R-V School District - Niangua
Niangua Elementary School - (K-06)
Niangua High School - (07-12)
Seymour R-II School District - Seymour
Seymour Elementary School - (PK-05)
Seymour Middle School - (06-08)
Seymour High School - (09-12)

Private schools
Ozark Mennonite School - Seymour - (01-10) - Mennonite
Marshfield Christian School - Marshfield - (K-12) - Nondenominational Christianity

Public libraries
Seymour Public Library

Communities

Cities

Fordland
Marshfield (county seat)
Niangua
Rogersville
Seymour
Strafford

Village
Diggins

Unincorporated communities

 All
 Beach
 Bracken
 Caddo
 Conklin
 Crown
 Duncan
 Elkland
 Forkners Hill
 Henderson
 High Prairie
 Mountain Dale
 Northview
 Olga
 Panther Valley
 Rader
 Red Top
 Sampson
 Sarvis Point
 Susanna
 Waldo
 Zenar

See also
National Register of Historic Places listings in Webster County, Missouri

References

Further reading
 History of Laclede, Camden, Dallas, Webster, Wright, Texas, Pulaski, Phelps, and Dent counties, Missouri (1889) full text

External links
  - Historical Tornadoes
  - Eyewitness account of the Marshfield tornado
 Digitized 1930 Plat Book of Webster County  from University of Missouri Division of Special Collections, Archives, and Rare Books

 
1855 establishments in Missouri
Springfield metropolitan area, Missouri
Populated places established in 1855